Coleocentrus caligatus is a parasitoid wasp from ichneumonid family that parasitizes long-horned beetle of Tetropium castaneum.

References

Ichneumonidae
Taxa named by Johann Ludwig Christian Gravenhorst
Insects described in 1829